John Falk was a politician.

John Falk or Faulk may also refer to:

John H. Falk (born 1948), professor at Oregon State University
John Falk (racing driver) in 2002 Bathurst 24 Hour
John Falk, screenwriter of Shot Through the Heart
John Faulk (Texas politician) in United States House of Representatives elections in Texas, 2010
John Henry Faulk, radio host